The Centre or the Région du Centre is a region within the province of Hainaut in Wallonia, Belgium. It is part of the Sillon industriel or industrial centre of Belgium.

It is located between the cities of Mons (the Borinage), Charleroi and Thuin (the Pays Noir) and Brabant. Its most important town is La Louvière. The region gives its name to the Canal du Centre, between Mons  and Thieu, a village near La Louvière.

The region had its own newspaper from 1945 to 1987,  L'Echo du Centre. There is also a regional television station, Antenne Centre.

Municipalities
The following municipalities are usually assumed to be within the region.

Anderlues
Binche
Braine-le-Comte
Chapelle-lez-Herlaimont
Écaussinnes
Estinnes
La Louvière
Le Rœulx
Manage
Merbes-le-Château
Morlanwelz
Seneffe
Soignies

References

External links
Images

La Louvière
Geography of Hainaut (province)
Regions of Wallonia
History of Wallonia
Areas of Belgium